The 2007 Triple J Hottest 100 was announced on Australia Day, 26 January 2008.  It was the fifteenth countdown of the most popular songs of the year, as chosen by the listeners of Australian radio station Triple J.

Voting began on 1 January 2008, and closed on 20 January 2008.  More than 700,000 votes were counted in the poll. The broadcast began at 10 a.m. AEST, and for the first time was broadcast live to all time zones (as opposed to being on a delayed broadcast).  Triple J hosted two live sites, one at The Domain, Sydney and one at Melbourne Docklands.

The 2007 poll was the closest in Hottest 100 history with only 13 votes separating the number 1 and 2 songs. The 2007 Hottest 100 contained 52 works by Australian artists. This equals the results in the 1999 poll.

Full list 
Note: Australian artists 

The #101 spot belonged to "Foundations" by Kate Nash

Artists with multiple entries

Three tracks:

 Silverchair (2, 30, 80)
 Kings of Leon (3, 33, 60)
 John Butler Trio (4, 22, 55)
 Bloc Party (24, 40, 48)
 Josh Pyke (79, 91, 97)
 Harry Angus (Twice with The Cat Empire and once with Jackson Jackson) (50, 62, 87)

Two tracks:

 Muse (1, 58)
 Foo Fighters (6, 82)
 Cold War Kids (8, 37)
 Muscles (14, 76)
 Powderfinger (15, 66)
 Architecture in Helsinki (19, 36)
 The Chemical Brothers (21, 84)
 Operator Please (27, 77)
 Regina Spektor (29, 95)
 Angus and Julia Stone (31, 45)
 Kisschasy (32, 52)
 Tegan and Sara (42, 70)
 British India (46, 74)
 Arctic Monkeys (49, 78)
 The Cat Empire (50, 62)
 Missy Higgins (51, 53)
 Midnight Juggernauts (57, 86)
 Ian Kenny (Once with Birds of Tokyo and once with Karnivool) (61, 63)

Countries represented
 Australia - 52 songs
 United States - 20 songs
 United Kingdom - 18 songs
 Canada - 4 songs
 France - 3 songs
 Sweden - 2 songs
 Germany - 1 song

Top 10 Albums of 2007

Trivia
 This is the first time in over ten years that The Living End did not feature in The Hottest 100.
 Muse's Knights of Cydonia was actually released July 2006, making the song over 18 months old when it was awarded the number 1 spot.
 Daft Punk's Harder, Better, Faster, Stronger made an appearance twice in the top twenty, in a live version, number 7, and remixed in Kanye West's Stronger, at number 20.

CD release
Triple J's Hottest 100 Volume 15 is the compilation featuring the best of the Top 100 voted tracks on two CDs.  It went on sale 8 March 2008.

References

External links
Triple J Hottest 100

2007 in Australian music
Australia Triple J
2007